Phil Mack (born 18 September 1985 in Victoria, British Columbia) is a rugby union scrum-half who played for the Seattle Seawolves in Major League Rugby (MLR). He was the Seawolves head coach, winning an MLR Championship Shield in 2018. He also plays for the Canada national rugby union team. He is currently an assistant coach for the Pacific Pride rugby team.

He played for Oak bay Scondary school, a historic rugby program in his home town. Phil also played for the BC Bears in Canada.

Professional Rugby Career
Mack made his debut for Team Canada in 2009 and was part of the Canada squad at the 2015 Rugby World Cup.

In 2013, he signed a short-term contract with the Ospreys.

In 2018, Mack signed with the Seattle Seawolves in the inaugural season of Major League Rugby as a player/head coach. He was the starting scrum-half. His team went onto win the first ever MRL Shield trophy in the Championship against the Glendale Raptors.

In 2019, Mack continued his MLR career with the Seawolves as a player and full-time backs coach and won another Shield trophy, becoming a back-to-back champion.

In 2020, Mack played two games for Canada in the Pacific Nations Cup tournament. He started against South Africa in what would be his 59th and final cap for his country. He considered retirement but got another opportunity to coach the Seawolves again.

Although Mack started the season as an assistant coach, the season was suspended due to the COVID-19 pandemic in 2020 and he was let go from the team for next season because of budget cutbacks.

Personal life
Mack is a member of the Toquaht First Nation. He created Thunder Rugby to promote rugby within the Indigenous community on Vancouver Island.

In 2020, Mack and his wife, Becky welcomed a new baby boy, Tate Joseph, into their family.

References

External links

1985 births
Living people
21st-century First Nations people
Canadian expatriate rugby union players
Canadian expatriate sportspeople in the United States
Canada international rugby sevens players
Canada international rugby union players
Commonwealth Games rugby sevens players of Canada
Expatriate rugby union players in the United States
First Nations sportspeople
Nuu-chah-nulth people
Pan American Games gold medalists for Canada
Pan American Games medalists in rugby sevens
Rugby sevens players at the 2010 Commonwealth Games
Rugby sevens players at the 2011 Pan American Games
Rugby sevens players at the 2015 Pan American Games
Sportspeople from Victoria, British Columbia
Seattle Seawolves players
Medalists at the 2011 Pan American Games
Medalists at the 2015 Pan American Games
Ospreys (rugby union) players